Cowpens National Battlefield is a unit of the National Park Service just east of Chesnee, South Carolina, and near the state line with North Carolina. It preserves a major battlefield of the American Revolutionary War.

Brigadier General Daniel Morgan won the Battle of Cowpens, a decisive Revolutionary War victory over British Lieutenant Colonel Banastre Tarleton on January 17, 1781. It is considered one of Morgan's most memorable victories and one of Tarleton's most memorable defeats.

Established as Cowpens National Battlefield Site March 4, 1929; transferred from the War Department August 10, 1933; redesignated April 11, 1972.  Listed on the National Register of Historic Places on October 15, 1966. Area: 841.56 acres (3.41 km2), Federal: , Nonfederal: .

The visitor center features a museum with exhibits about the American Revolution and the battle, including a fiber-optic map that illustrates the Southern Campaign of the American Revolution and the battle, a walking tour of the battlefield itself, and the reconstructed log cabin of one Robert Scruggs, who had farmed the land before the establishment of the park.

References

 The National Parks: Index 2001-2003. Washington: U.S. Department of the Interior.

External links
 
 National Park Service: Cowpens National Battlefield

Parks on the National Register of Historic Places in South Carolina
American Revolutionary War sites
Protected areas of Cherokee County, South Carolina
National Battlefields and Military Parks of the United States
Museums in Cherokee County, South Carolina
Protected areas established in 1929
American Revolutionary War museums in South Carolina
National Park Service areas in South Carolina
Parks in South Carolina
1929 establishments in South Carolina
Historic districts on the National Register of Historic Places in South Carolina
National Register of Historic Places in Cherokee County, South Carolina
American Revolution on the National Register of Historic Places
Conflict sites on the National Register of Historic Places in Virginia